Khalil Abdel-Karim (خليل عبد الكريم Arabic) (born in Aswan City in Upper Egypt) was an Egyptian writer, scholar and lawyer.

Early life
Mr. Khalil Abdul-Karim joined the Muslim Brotherhood in his youth. After attaining his high school diploma he traveled to Cairo to study Law and he graduated from Cairo University (then, Fouad the First University).

Career
Mr. Abdul-Karim started his law-practice office where he was the head of the defense team (Primary and Appeal Courts) in the case of Professor Nasr Abu Zayd who was sued for ridda (apostasy from Islam) and for separation from his wife.

Books
Books of Khalil Abdel-Karim: All in Arabic with some translations:

"For Applying Shari'a not for Governing"
"Man-women Relationship during the prophetic and caliphate periods the soiciety of yathrib"
"The Historical roots of Islamic shari'a"
"qurayish: from tribe to state"
"Islam between  the civil and islamic state"
"Shadou Rababa bi ahwal mujtama'al-sahaba"
"The Arabs and the women"
"The state of yathreb The year of Delegates"
"Against the fundamentalism of Islamists"
"The Eslabished period of Mohamed"
"The Founding Concepts of the Islamic Left"

References

External links
Cairo Times banned for carrying interview with Khalil Abdel Karim
The Red Sheikh teaches a mixture of social justice and liberal Islam

People from Aswan
2003 deaths
Egyptian academics
Islamic scholars
Muslim reformers
20th-century Muslim scholars of Islam
Cairo University alumni
Islam-related controversies
Egyptian writers
20th-century Egyptian lawyers